The Ligurian regional election of 1990 took place on 6 and 7 May 1990.

Events
Christian Democracy and the Italian Communist Party lost many votes, especially to Ligurian Union and the Greens. After the election Christian Democrat Giacomo Gualco formed a government with the Italian Socialist Party and their centrist allies (Pentapartito). In 1992 Glauco was replaced by Edmondo Ferrero, to whom Giancarlo Mori succeeded in 1994 with a centre-left majority.

Results 

Source: Ministry of the Interior

1990 elections in Italy
Elections in Liguria